A concrete masonry unit (CMU) is a standard-size rectangular block used in building construction. CMUs are some of the most versatile building products available because of the wide variety of appearances that can be achieved using them.

Those that use cinders (fly ash or bottom ash) as an aggregate material are called cinder blocks in the United States, breeze blocks (breeze is a synonym of ash) in the United Kingdom, and hollow blocks in the Philippines. In New Zealand and Canada they are known as concrete blocks (a name common in the United States also). In New Zealand, they are also called construction blocks. In Australia, they are known as Besser blocks or Besser bricks, because the Besser Company was a major supplier of machines that made concrete blocks. Clinker blocks use clinker as aggregate. 

In non-technical usage, the terms cinder block and breeze block are often generalized to cover all of these varieties.

Composition
Concrete blocks are made from cast concrete (e.g. Portland cement and aggregate, usually sand and fine gravel, for high-density blocks). Lower density blocks may use industrial wastes, such as fly ash or bottom ash, as an aggregate. Recycled materials, such as post-consumer glass, slag cement, or recycled aggregate, are often used in the composition of the blocks. Use of recycled materials within blocks can create different appearances in the block, such as a terrazzo finish, and may help the finished structure earn LEED certification. Lightweight blocks can also be produced using autoclaved aerated concrete; these are widely used for construction in Finland and other Scandinavian countries, as well as in central Europe, for the material's inherent thermal isolation characteristics, as are expanded clay aggregate blocks.

Sizes and structure
The use of blockwork allows structures to be built in the traditional masonry style with layers (or courses) of staggered blocks. Concrete blocks may be produced with hollow centers (cores) to reduce weight, improve insulation and provide an interconnected void into which concrete can be poured to solidify the entire wall after it is built. Blocks come in modular sizes, with the most popular typically referred to (by their thickness) as "4-inch", "6-inch", "8-inch", and "12-inch". Their actual dimensions are  less than the nominal dimensions (to allow for -inch mortar joints between blocks in any orientation). In Ireland and the UK, blocks are usually  excluding mortar joints. In Australia, New Zealand and Canada, blocks are usually  excluding mortar joints.

Block cores are typically tapered so that their top surface (as laid) has a greater surface on which to spread a mortar bed and for easier handling. Most CMUs have two cores, but three- and four-core units are also produced. A core also allows for the insertion of steel reinforcement to span courses in order to increase tensile strength.  This is accomplished by grouting the voids of blocks containing rebar with concrete. Thus reinforced, CMU walls are better able to resist lateral forces such as wind load and seismic forces. Cores may also be filled with expanded-polystyrene (EPS) block foam insulation, substantially increasing the R-value of the resulting wall to be in compliance with the US national energy code. 

A variety of specialized shapes exist to allow special construction features.  U-shaped blocks or knockout blocks with notches to allow the construction of bond beams or lintel assemblies, using horizontal reinforcing grouted into place in the cavity. Blocks with a channel on the end, known as "jamb blocks", allow doors to be secured to wall assemblies. Blocks with grooved ends permit the construction of control joints, allowing a filler material to be anchored between the un-mortared block ends. Other features, such as radiused corners known as "bullnoses" may be incorporated. A wide variety of decorative profiles also exist.

CMUs may be formulated with special aggregates to produce specific colors or textures for finish use. Special textures may be produced by splitting a ribbed or solid two-block unit; such factory-produced units are called "split-rib" or "split-face" blocks. Blocks may be scored by grooves the width of a mortar joint to simulate different block modules. For example, an  block may be scored in the middle to simulate  masonry, with the grooves filled with mortar and struck to match the true joints.

General information

Uses

Concrete block, when built with integral steel reinforcement, is a very common building material for the load-bearing walls of buildings, in what is termed concrete block structure (CBS) construction. One of the common foundation types for American suburban houses is the "crawl space foundation" which consists of a concrete block wall around the perimeter on which dimensional lumber floor joists are supported. Retaining walls, which also can be constructed of concrete blocks, either using blocks designed to be set back each course and used with a sand base and without mortar or reinforcing (gravity wall), or using blocks (typically an architectural style of block or clad with a veneer such as brick) with a concrete base, steel reinforcing and mortar (piling wall). Other very common, non-structural uses for concrete block walls (especially in American schools) are as interior fire-rated and extremely durable partition walls, and as exterior backup curtain walls for attachment of building envelope systems (rigid foam insulation and an air/vapor barrier) and veneers (stucco, steel, brick, or split-face concrete block).

Structural properties
Concrete masonry walls may be ungrouted, partially grouted, or fully grouted, the latter two enhancing their structural strength. Additionally, steel reinforcement bars (rebar) can be used both vertically and horizontally inside a CMU wall to maximize its structural performance. The cells in which the rebar is placed must be grouted for the bars to bond to the wall. For this reason, high-seismic zones typically allow only fully grouted walls in their building codes. The American design code that guides design engineers in using CMU as a structural system is the Masonry Standards Joint Committee's Building Code Requirements & Specification for Masonry Structures (TMS 402/ACI 530/ASCE 5). 

The compressive strength of concrete masonry units and masonry walls varies from approximately  based on the type of concrete used to manufacture the unit, stacking orientation, the type of mortar used to build the wall, it depends on whether it is a load-bearing partition or not and other factors.

See also 
 Concrete bricks
 Gypsum block
 Rusticated concrete block
 Fly ash brick

References

Sources

External links 

 How Products Are Made: Volume 3 Concrete Block
 Concrete Masonry Association of California and Nevada
 National Concrete Masonry Association
 Mason Contractors Association of America
 Concrete Block Association
 Masonry Institute of America
 "The History Behind Rock Face Block"—Classic Rock Face Block

Masonry
Soil-based building materials